A list of films produced in Brazil in 1951:

See also
 1951 in Brazil

External links
Brazilian films of 1951 at the Internet Movie Database

Brazil
1951
Films